John Enoul Jumonville Jr. (born December 30, 1942) is an American politician and horse breeder. He served as a Democratic member for the 17th district of the Louisiana State Senate.

Born in Louisiana, the son of J. E. Jumonville Sr., Jumonville attended at the Louisiana State University, where he earned his Bachelor of Science degree. He worked as a horse breeder on his ranch, Jumonville Farms. In 1976, he won the election for the 17th district of the Louisiana State Senate, succeeding his father. In 1992, he was succeeded by Tom Greene for the office.

In 1986, Jumonville ran for election to the United States Senate, but was not elected. Jumonville also served as a candidate for the 8th district of Louisiana of the United States House of Representatives, but was unsuccessful.

References 

1942 births
Living people
People from Pointe Coupee Parish, Louisiana
Democratic Party Louisiana state senators
20th-century American politicians
American racehorse owners and breeders
Ranchers from Louisiana
Businesspeople from Louisiana
Louisiana State University alumni